Microsoft Office is a set of interrelated desktop applications, servers and services, collectively referred to as an office suite, for the Microsoft Windows and macOS operating systems.

This list contains all the programs that are, or have been, in Microsoft Office since

Current Microsoft 365 Applications

Server applications

Discontinued programs

See also
Microsoft Office shared tools
List of office suites
Comparison of office suites
Microsoft Map Point
Microsoft Visual Studio
Microsoft Works
Microsoft Engage 365

References

External links
The Microsoft Office page for Windows
The Microsoft Office page for macOS
Training Center for Microsoft Office Application
The Microsoft Engage 365 CRM Suite

 
Office
Office suites for Windows
Office suites for macOS